Helene Jung (14 June 1887, Weimar – 3 October 1975, Gosheim) was a German operatic mezzo-soprano and contralto. She premiered three roles in operas written by Richard Strauss: the omniscient seashell in Die ägyptische Helena, the housekeeper in Die schweigsame Frau, and Gaea in Daphne.

References

1887 births
1975 deaths
German operatic mezzo-sopranos
German operatic contraltos
20th-century German women opera singers